Prince Ignacy Massalski (1726–1794) was a Polish-Lithuanian nobleman.

Ignacy became a Catholic priest and was named Bishop of Vilnius by Pope Clement XIII on 29 March 1762. He was one of the initiators of the Commission for National Education.  During his time on the Commission, Massalski set up 300 parish schools.

In 1776 he was removed from the Commission for embezzlement of public funds. He was succeeded as head of the Commission by Michał Jerzy Poniatowski.

He was a supporter of the Targowica Confederation and an opponent of the Kościuszko Uprising.  As bishop, Massalski was opposed to the kidnapping and forcible conversion of Jewish children.  He published a pastoral letter in 1783 condemning such practices.

Massalski commissioned the reconstruction of the Vilnius Cathedral by Laurynas Gucevičius, which brought it to its present appearance. He became the owner of the Verkiai Palace in 1780 and organized its major reconstruction in the Neoclassical style, also by Gucevičius.

Accused of treason, he was hanged in Warsaw on 28 June 1794 by an angry mob in the aftermath of the Warsaw Uprising.

References

1726 births
1794 deaths
People from Byerastavitsa District
People from Trakai Voivodeship
Ignacy Jakub
Bishops of Vilnius
Ecclesiastical senators of the Polish–Lithuanian Commonwealth
18th-century Roman Catholic bishops in the Polish–Lithuanian Commonwealth
Targowica confederates
People executed for treason against Poland
People executed by the Polish–Lithuanian Commonwealth
People executed by Poland by hanging
Executed Polish people
Executed Lithuanian people
Executed Belarusian people
18th-century executions
Recipients of the Order of the White Eagle (Poland)